The Best Polish Love Songs... Ever!- is a compilation released by EMI in early 2009. It hypothetically contains the best polish love songs of all the time.

Track listing

CD 1
Bajm- "Myśli i słowa"
Ryszard Rynkowski- "Intymnie"
Edyta Górniak- "Nie proszę o więcej"
Justyna Steczkowska- "Zadzwoń do mnie"
Krzysztof Krawczyk- "Bo jesteś Ty"
Varius Manx- "Piosenka księżycowa"
Robert Gawliński- "Nie pokonasz miłości"
Stachursky- "Z każdym Twym oddechem"
Kasia Kowalska- "Starczy słów"
Łzy- "Oczy szeroko zamknięte"
Maanam- "Kocham Cię kochanie moje"
T.Love feat. Zychtowsky Stephan- "I Love You"
Róże Europy- "Jedwab"
Lady Pank- "Zawsze tam gdzie Ty"
Urszula- "Niebo dla Ciebie"
De Mono- "Kochać inaczej"
Chłopcy z Placu Broni- "Kocham Cię"

CD 2
Edyta Bartosiewicz- "Opowieść"
Myslovitz- "Chciałbym umrzeć z miłości"
Republika- "Zapytaj mnie czy Cię kocham"
Maria Peszek- "Miły mój"
Raz Dwa Trzy- "Czarna Inez"
Kasia Nosowska- "Karatetyka"
Anita Lipnicka- "Historia jednej miłości"
Grzegorz Turnau & Justyna Steczkowska- "Niebezpieczne związki"
Kasia Groniec- "Dzięki za miłość"
Tomek Makowiecki- "Jak dobrze, że jesteś"
Marysia Sadowska- "Kiedy nie ma miłości"
Ewa Bem- "Słowem…"
Varius Manx- "Jestem Tobą"
Piotr Rubik- "Most dwojga serc"
Sławek Uniatowski- "Kocham Cię"
Andrzej Piaseczny- "I jeszcze"
Maciej Balcar- "Moja rozmowa"

CD 3
Krzysztof Kiljański feat. Kayah- "Prócz Ciebie nic"
PIN- "Niekochanie"
Anna Maria Jopek- "A gdybyśmy się nie spotkali"
Ania- "Pamiętać chcę"
Goya- "Smak słów"
Grzegorz Turnau- "Będziesz moją panią"
Bisquit- "Jeszcze lepiej"
Natalia Kukulska feat. Bartek Królik- "Pół na pół"
Kasia Klich- "Zaproszenie"
Katarzyna Skrzynecka feat. Mietek Szcześniak- "Zabierz mnie do domu"
Reni Jusis- "Miej oczy otwarte"
Novika feat. Futro- "Spacer po miłość"
Iza Lach- "Nie"
Piotr Polk- "Tylko Ty"
Hania Stach- "Gdy Cię nie ma (obok mnie)"
  - "Kocham (tylko Ciebie)"
Tilt- "Tak jak ja kocham Cię"
Banach feat. Gutek- "Jego piosenka o miłości"
Hey- "Mimo wszystko"

CD 4
Perfect- "Kołysanka dla nieznajomej"
Feel- "Jak anioła głos"
Wilki- "Na zawsze i na wieczność"
Marcin Rozynek- "Historia miłosna"
Patrycja Markowska- "Kilka prostych prawd"
Ewelina Flinta- "Nieskończona historia"
Mafia- "Imię deszczu"
Dirty Track- "Zabiorę Cię właśnie tam"
Blue Café- "Czas nie będzie czekał"
Kasia Cerekwicka- "Ostatnia szansa"
Sylwia Grzeszczak feat. Liber- "Co z nami będzie"
Łukasz Zagrobelny- "Nieprawda"
Kombii- "Myślę o Tobie"
Sumptuastic- "Za jeden uśmiech Twój"
Janusz Panasewicz- "Po co słowa"
Sylwia Wiśniewska- "Jeden Ty i jedna ja"
Kasia Wilk- "Pierwszy raz"
Karolina Kozak- "Razem zestarzejemy się"
Mezo,  feat. Kasia Wilk- "Sacrum"

External links
 album description (in Polish)

Polish Love Songs
2009 compilation albums
Compilation albums by Polish artists